This is a list of physicists who have worked in or made notable contributions to the field of plasma physics.

See also
 Whistler (radio) waves
 Langmuir waves

 
Plasma physicists
Plasma physicists